John Tatham was an Oxford college head in the 16th-century.

Tatham was a Fellow of Merton College, Oxford, from 1563 to 1576. He was Proctor in 1573 and became Rector of Lincoln College, Oxford in 1574. He also held the Living at Waterstock. He was buried at All Saints Church, Oxford on 30 November 1576.

References

Fellows of Merton College, Oxford
Rectors of Lincoln College, Oxford
16th-century English people